The Klimov M-120 was a Soviet prototype 18-cylinder liquid-cooled inline aircraft engine designed during the early years of World War II. Testing did not go well and it was cancelled in 1942.

Development
The M-120 was developed by arranging three Klimov M-103A cylinder blocks in an inverted 'Y' configuration, driving a common crankshaft. It began development in 1938 and manufacture of five prototypes began in late 1939. The first prototype was completed on 30 October 1939 and began bench tests the next year. Two M-120TKs were flown in a prototype Ilyushin DB-4 bomber in November 1940. It was submitted for its State acceptance trials in August 1941, but the main connecting rod and the supercharger both broke down and the tests were not completed. The project was cancelled in 1942.

Variants
M-120
M-120TK
M-120UV
. Version with a long shaft to the remote reduction gear.
M-120UV-TK
A 1940 project to combine the two variants.

Specifications (M-120TK)

See also

References

Notes

Bibliography

  

1940s aircraft piston engines
M-120